Anton de Franckenpoint (known as Langer Anton, "Long Anton";  16th century AD) was the first verified person to reach , or more in height. Anton was working as a personal guard of Christian von Braunschweig-Wolfenbüttel.

Skeleton
In 1810, his skeleton was added to the Museum Anatomicum in Marburg. His skeleton is not complete, one arm is missing, his shoulder blades are not connected, his breastbones are missing, and his feet are made of cork.

See also
List of tallest people
List of people with gigantism

References

People with gigantism